Tien-sing or Tiong Sing, originally named Chin-ou (金甌) and sometimes referred to as Jinou, was an ironclad flat-iron gunboat built for the Imperial Chinese Navy. She was completed in 1875 at the Kiangnan Arsenal, the first time an ironclad had been constructed in China. She was built out of spare components, prior to the construction of a purpose built yard for ironclads. Tien-sing was modified part way through construction to allow it to undertake a sea voyage to Hai River, but instead was only ever used on the Yangtze and Huangpu Rivers. She was still in operation in 1902, having survived the Sino-French War and the First Sino-Japanese War.

Design
Tien-sing was the only ship of its type constructed, which was built out of spare iron and an extra 17 cm Krupp gun at the Kiangnan Arsenal. It had been intended for ironclads to be built there, and Tien-sing was constructed while the ironclad building yard was also under construction. This made her the first home built ironclad in Chinese service, with the vessel known locally as "The Terror of the Western World". Her design was later compared to that of HMS Staunch of the Royal Navy, but with additional protection for the Krupp gun. She displaced . The propulsion system consisted of a  reciprocating engine with twin shafts. She had a total crew complement of 40.

The Krupp gun was on a retractable mount which meant it could be moved into the hull of the ironclad. This was the only armament, other than the forward mounted naval ram which was used to offset the weight of the engine. This initial design was to enable her to act as a river-based ironclad, primarily near the mouth of the Huangpu River, and occasionally on the Yangtze. However, Li Hongzhang felt that she should instead be used to defend the Hai River, which would require her to undertake a sea voyage to get there. Changes were then made to the design to improve her buoyancy.

Career
She was completed in 1875, and had been due to be launched in September of that year. After becoming stuck on the slipway, she was launched at a later date. She was never sent to the Hai River, instead being used as she was originally intended. She was still in operation as of 1888, following the Sino-French War. By 1902, she formed part of the south squadron based out of Fuzhou and Canton, having survived the First Sino-Japanese War, during which time the ships of the northern fleet in the Hai River had been either destroyed or captured.

Annotations

Notes

References

 

 

1875 ships
Naval ships of Imperial China
Ironclad warships
Ships built in China